Woodley station may refer to:
 Woodley railway station, Stockport, England
 Woodley station (Orange Line), Los Angeles